The Hatia–Rourkela line is an Indian railway line connecting  on the Netaji S.C.Bose Gomoh–Hatia line in Jharkhand with Rourkela on the Tatanagar–Bilaspur section in Odisha. This  track is under the jurisdiction of South Eastern Railway.

History
The construction of the -long broad-gauge Chandrapura–Muri–Ranchi–Hatia line was started in 1957 and was completed in 1961. The construction of this line included the conversion of the narrow-gauge Kotshila–Ranchi line to broad gauge. The Ranchi–Hatia–Bondamunda section was opened in 1965.

Electrification
The electrification of Bondamunda Yard–Dumetra–Bangurkela link lines was done in 1998–99. The Bondamunda–Orga, Orga–Tati and Tati–Hatia sectors were electrified in 2001–02.

References

5 ft 6 in gauge railways in India
Rail transport in West Bengal
Rail transport in Jharkhand

Transport in Asansol
Transport in Jamshedpur
Transport in Kharagpur